Cedral is a municipality in the state of São Paulo, Brazil. The population is 9,346 (2020 est.) in an area of 197.9 km². The municipality belongs to the mesoregion and microregion of São José do Rio Preto.

Demographics

The life expectancy for the city is 75.15 years.

References

External links
  http://www.cedral.sp.gov.br 
  Cedral on citybrazil.com.br

Municipalities in São Paulo (state)